In the 1945–46 season, USM Blida is competing in the Division Honneur for the 14th season French colonial era, as well as the Forconi Cup. They will be competing in Division Honneur, and the North African Cup.

Pre-season

Competitions

Overview

Division Honneur

League table

Matches

Play-off

Forconi Cup

Players statistics

|-
! colspan=12 style=background:#dcdcdc; text-align:center| Goalkeepers

|-
! colspan=12 style=background:#dcdcdc; text-align:center| Defenders

|-
! colspan=12 style=background:#dcdcdc; text-align:center| Midfielders

|-
! colspan=12 style=background:#dcdcdc; text-align:center| Forwards

|}

Goalscorers

References

External links
Presse et revues L'Echo d'Alger : journal républicain du matin 1945, 1946.
Algérie radicale. Magazine politique, littéraire, sportif. Le grand hebdomadaire officiel des Fédérations républicaines radicales socialistes d'Algérie 1946.
Algérie magazine 1945, 1946.

USM Blida seasons
Algerian football clubs 1945–46 season